H. Nickolas Bell (born August 19, 1968) is a former professional American football running back in the National Football League. He played three seasons for the Los Angeles Raiders.

Nick moved to Cedar Rapids, Iowa and was an assistant coach for the Cedar Rapids Semi-Pro football team from 1998-1999.

References

External links
 

1968 births
Living people
American football running backs
Iowa Hawkeyes football players
Los Angeles Raiders players
Sportspeople from Las Vegas
Players of American football from Nevada